The Midlands Rugby League Premier Division is the highest level of amateur rugby league in the English Midlands. It was previously the Midlands Premier Division of the Rugby League Conference. Many of the clubs run juniors in the Midlands Junior League.

History

The Rugby League Conference was born in 1997, then known as the Southern Conference. The Premier Division were set up in 2005 for teams who had achieved a certain playing standard and were able to travel further afield to find stronger opposition.

The new Premier Divisions included the North Premier, the South Premier, the Central Premier and the Welsh Premier. The Central Premier had two Midlands clubs Telford Raiders and Nottingham Outlaws and the rest of the clubs were from Yorkshire or Lancashire.

The Midlands Premier was created one season later in 2006. The founder members were Coventry Bears, Telford Raiders, Nottingham Outlaws, Derby City, Birmingham Bulldogs, Leicester Phoenix and Wolverhampton Wizards.

In 2012 the Rugby League Conference will be disbanded and the Midlands Premier will continue as Midlands Rugby League Premier Division.

Community game pyramid

 National Conference League
 Conference League South
 Midlands Rugby League Premier Division
 Midlands Rugby League Division One
 Midlands Rugby League Division Two

2015 structure
Birmingham Bulldogs
Boston Buccaneers
Buxton Bulls
Coventry Dragons
Derby City
Leamington Royals
Leicester Storm A
North East Worcestershire Ravens
Northampton Demons
Nottingham Outlaws A
Sherwood Wolf Hunt
Telford Raiders

2014 structure
Birmingham Bulldogs
Coventry Dragons
Derby City
Leamington Royals
Leicester Storm A
North Derbyshire Chargers (failed to complete the season)
North East Worcestershire Ravens
Northampton Demons
Nottingham Outlaws A
Telford Raiders

2013 structure
Birmingham Bulldogs
Coventry Bears A
Coventry Dragons
Leicester Storm A
North Derbyshire Chargers
North East Worcestershire Ravens
Northampton Demons A
Nottingham Outlaws A
Sleaford Spartans
Telford Raiders

2012 structure

Teams play each other three times culminating in a grand final.

League standings

Key

Titles

RLC Midlands Premier
2006 Nottingham Outlaws
2007 Coventry Bears
2008 Nottingham Outlaws
2009 Coventry Bears 48 Derby City 16
2010 Coventry Bears
2011 Bristol Sonics

Midlands Rugby League Premier Division
2012 Northampton Demons
2013 Telford Raiders

External links
 Official website
 Unofficial RLC website
 Midlands rugby league site
 Gloucestershire Rugby League

Rugby League Conference
Rugby league in England
2006 establishments in England
Sports leagues established in 2006